"NYC" is a one-off single released by Prince (then known as The Artist) in 1997.  The single was available only from Prince's NPG retail store known as "1-800-NEW-FUNK" and only in cassette format.  It was also advertised as a "4th generation bootleg", possibly in an attempt to increase sales from diehard fans.  It was recorded live at the Roseland Ballroom on January 11, 1997 in New York City.

Track one was "Jam of the Year", the opening song from Prince's 1996 album Emancipation.  It also became the name of the tour for the album. The B-side of the single was a live rendition of "Face Down", also from the same concert and edited to sound like it segued from "Jam of the Year".

Track listing
Tracks repeat on both sides.
"Jam of the Year" – 5:21
"Face Down" – 8:33

NYC
NYC